

The Halfpenny Marvel was a British story paper for children of the late 19th and early 20th centuries, published by Amalgamated Press. It was the first of Alfred Harmsworth's story papers aimed at putting the "penny dreadfuls" out of business by producing "pure, healthy literature" at a cheaper price. Begun in 1893, the magazine was originally named The Halfpenny Marvel Library, but was shorted to The Marvel in 1898. The magazine folded in 1922.

References

1893 establishments in the United Kingdom
1922 disestablishments in the United Kingdom
British boys' story papers
Children's magazines published in the United Kingdom
Defunct literary magazines published in the United Kingdom
Magazines established in 1893
Magazines disestablished in 1922
Publications of Sexton Blake